Tonga competed at the 2014 Summer Youth Olympics, in Nanjing, China from 16 August to 28 August 2014.

Archery

Tonga was given a quota to compete by the tripartite committee.

Individual

Team

Swimming

Tonga qualified one swimmer.

Girls

Weightlifting

Tonga was given a quota to compete in a boys' event by the tripartite committee.

Boys

References

2014 in Tongan sport
Nations at the 2014 Summer Youth Olympics
Tonga at the Youth Olympics